Río Cauto is a municipality and town in the Granma Province of Cuba. It is located in the northern part of the province, upstream of the mouth of Cauto River.

Demographics
In 2004, the municipality of Río Cauto had a population of 47,833.

See also
Municipalities of Cuba
List of cities in Cuba

References

External links

Populated places in Granma Province